Papakura is an electorate for the New Zealand House of Representatives, based in the south Auckland town of Papakura. In  Hunua was modified, pulled northwards and renamed .

This new Papakura seat is the successor to the old Clevedon seat. It also contains a set of towns to the west of Papakura, namely Drury, Karaka and Kingseat. Until 2014 it also included Waiau Pa and Clarks Beach. The current MP is Judith Collins, of the National Party.

Population centres

The 1977 electoral redistribution was the most overtly political since the Representation Commission had been established through an amendment to the Representation Act in 1886, initiated by Muldoon's National Government. As part of the 1976 census, a large number of people failed to fill out an electoral re-registration card, and census staff had not been given the authority to insist on the card being completed. This had little practical effect for people on the general roll, but it transferred Māori to the general roll if the card was not handed in. Together with a northward shift of New Zealand's population, this resulted in five new electorates having to be created in the upper part of the North Island. The electoral redistribution was very disruptive, and 22 electorates were abolished, while 27 electorates were newly created (including Papakura) or re-established.

History
In the 1978 election, the Papakura electorate was won by National's Merv Wellington, who had been MP for the Manurewa electorate since .

Members of Parliament

Key

1Robertson defected to the United party in 1995.

List MPs
Members of Parliament elected from party lists in elections where that person also unsuccessfully contested the Papakura electorate. Unless otherwise stated, all MPs' terms began and ended at general elections.

Key

Election results

2020 election

2017 election

2014 election

Electorate (as at 4 October 2014): 45,992

2011 election

Electorate (as at 26 November 2011): 44,164

2008 election

Table footnotes

Notes

References

Politics of the Auckland Region
Historical electorates of New Zealand
1978 establishments in New Zealand
1996 disestablishments in New Zealand
2008 establishments in New Zealand